João Carlos Novo de Araújo Gonçalves, known as Tuck (born 31 October 1969) is a Portuguese football coach and a former player. He is the manager of Sacavenense.

He played 13 seasons and 338 games in the Primeira Liga for Gil Vicente and Belenenses.

Club career
He made his Primeira Liga debut for Gil Vicente on 21 April 1991 in a game against Famalicão.

References

1969 births
People from Barcelos, Portugal
Living people
Portuguese footballers
Association football midfielders
Gil Vicente F.C. players
Primeira Liga players
Liga Portugal 2 players
C.F. Os Belenenses players
S.U. Sintrense managers
Portuguese football managers
Sportspeople from Braga District